was a Japanese daimyō of the late Edo period, who ruled the Matsue Domain.

Early life
Matsudaira Sadayasu was born in 1835, the seventh son of Matsudaira Naritaka of the Tsuyama Domain. In 1853, he was adopted by Matsudaira Naritoki, the 9th lord of Matsue. Soon after, Naritoki retired, and Sadayasu became lord of Matsue.

Political career
During Sadayasu's tenure as lord, Matsue samurai were deployed to security duties in Osaka and Kyoto. For much of the Bakumatsu period, the policy of Matsue was pro-shogunate.

Boshin War

In 1868, Matsue forces took part in the Boshin War on the side of the Meiji government. The same year, there was a peasant revolt in the Oki Islands, which was part of Matsue territory. Sadayasu dispatched troops to quell it by force; he withdrew after receiving complaints from Satsuma and Chōshū.

Retirement and death
Sadayasu was relieved of his duties as daimyō in 1871, due to the order for the abolition of the domains. He retired from family headship in 1872, in favor of his adopted son Naotaka. However, as Naotaka retired in 1877, Sadayasu again assumed headship until 1882. In 1882 he passed headship to his 3rd son Naosuke. A few weeks later he died, at age 48.

Notes

References
Koyasu Nobushige (1880). Buke kazoku meiyoden 武家家族名誉伝 Volume 2. Tokyo: Koyasu Nobushige. (Accessed from National Diet Library, 13 August 2008).
This article is derived from corresponding content on the Japanese Wikipedia.

See also
Matsue Domain
Matsudaira Harusato

1835 births
1882 deaths
Matsue-Matsudaira clan
Tsuyama-Matsudaira clan
People of the Boshin War
Meiji Restoration
Shinpan daimyo